are small humanoid and animal figurines made during the later part of the Jōmon period (14,000–400 BC) of prehistoric Japan. Dogū come exclusively from the Jōmon period, and were no longer made by the following Yayoi period. There are various styles of dogū, depending on the exhumation area and time period.

The National Museum of Japanese History estimates that the total number of dogū is approximately 15,000, with The Japan Times placing the figure at approximately 18,000. Dogū were made across all of Japan, except Okinawa. Most of the dogū have been found in eastern Japan and it is rare to find one in western Japan. The purpose of the dogū remains unknown and should not be confused with the clay haniwa funerary objects of the Kofun period (250 – 538 C.E.).

Everyday ceramic items from the period are called Jōmon pottery.

Origins
Some scholars theorize the dogū acted as effigies of people, that manifested some kind of sympathetic magic. For example, it may have been believed that illnesses could be transferred into the dogū, which were then destroyed, clearing the illness, or any other misfortune.

Characteristics
Dogū are made of clay and are small, typically 10 to 30 cm high. Most of the figurines appear to be modeled as female, and have big eyes, small waists, and wide hips. They are considered by many to be representative of goddesses. Many have large abdomens associated with pregnancy, suggesting that the Jomon considered them mother goddesses. According to the Metropolitan Museum of Art, these figurines "suggest an association with fertility and shamanistic rites". 

The dogū tend to have large faces, small arms and hands and compact bodies. Some appear to wear goggles or have "heart-shaped" faces. Most have marks on the face, chest and shoulders, that suggest tattooing and probable incision with bamboo.

Types
 "Heart-shaped (or crescent-shaped eyebrow)" figurine
 "Horned-owl type" figurine
 "Goggle-eyed type" (shakōkidogū) figurine
 "Pregnant woman type" figurine

Shakōkidogū

The , or "goggle-eyed dogū, were created in the Jōmon era, and are so well known that when most Japanese hear the term dogū, this is the image that comes to mind. The name shakōki (literally "light-blocking device") comes from the resemblance of the figures' eyes to traditional Inuit snow goggles. Another distinguishing feature of the objects are the exaggerated, female buttocks, chest and thighs. Furthermore, the abdomen is covered with patterns, many of which seem to have been painted with vermilion. The larger figures are hollow.

Unbroken figures are rare, and most are missing an arm, leg or other body part. In many cases, the parts have been cut off.

These types of dogū have been found in the Kamegaoka Site in Tsugaru, Aomori Prefecture; the Teshiromori Site in Morioka, Iwate Prefecture; the Ebisuda Site in Tajiri, Miyagi Prefecture; and the Izumisawa Kaizuka Site in Ishinomaki, Miyagi Prefecture. All the sites listed have been designated as Important Cultural Properties.

In popular culture
Dogū are a staple of Japanese pop culture, with numerous toys based on them being available in the country, as well as depictions in manga, anime, video games, and live action television series. Notable examples include Baltoy, Claydol, Elgyem, and Beheeyem, from the Pokémon franchise, Shakkoumon from the Digimon franchise, and Arahabaki from the Megami Tensei franchise. The tokusatsu The Ancient Dogoo Girl has several of its main main features based on dogū.

See also
 Haniwa, similar figures from the Kofun period
 National Treasures of Japan
 Tokyo National Museum
 Venus figurine, a type of clay figure found in archeological cultures throughout the world
 Zuijin

Footnotes

References

External links

 Tokyo National Museum
 The National Museum of Japanese History
 Comprehensive Database of Archaeological Site Reports in Japan, Nara National Research Institute for Cultural Properties
 Dogū from the Jōmon period, a photographic imagery database—Tokyo University, Japan 
 Review of recent exhibition of Dogū at the Tokyo National Museum
 British Museum exhibition of Dogū from Japanese museums, 2009

Archaeological artefact types
Japanese dolls
Japanese pottery
Japanese historical terms
Jōmon period